Botanichesky Sad is a Moscow Metro station in Rostokino District, North-Eastern Administrative Okrug, Moscow. It is on the Kaluzhsko–Rizhskaya line, between VDNKh and Sviblovo stations.

Botanichesky Sad opened on 29 September 1978 along with a northwest ward extension of the Rizhsky radius. The station is named after the Moscow Botanical Garden of Academy of Sciences. The name is somewhat confusing as the garden is near the entrance of the Vladykino station, but it takes a 10– 15 minute walk to get to the Botanical Garden from the Botanichesky Sad metro station.

Building

Botanichesky Sad was designed by architects N. Demchinsky and Yuliya Kolesnikova. The station features a pillar-trispan with a ceiling covered with a grid of modular anodized aluminium light fixtures. White marble was used in facing the pillars and the walls, but the walls are also decorated with aluminium artworks on various nature-based themes (artist Z. Vetrova).

The station has two entrances; the southern entrance is a surface rotunda building on Leonova Street which is internally lit by sculptural lamps (work of N. Masterpulo) and is linked by escalators to the main platform. As the station is located under Moscow's circular railway, the station was foreseen as a possible future transfer point. The northern subterranean entrance is on the opposite side of the Moscow Little Ring Railway and is linked with subways under the Serebryakova and Snezhnaya Streets. The station is connected with the entrance by a vaulted subway under the railway. Partly because of its relatively empty surrounding area, the Botanichesky Sad station has low daily passenger traffic of 28,650.

Moscow Metro stations
Railway stations in Russia opened in 1978
Kaluzhsko-Rizhskaya Line
Railway stations located underground in Russia